Love The Wine You're With is a 2017 romantic comedy novel by Kim Gruenenfelder. The book follows three friends who decide to open a wine bar in the Echo Park neighborhood of Los Angeles.

Release 
Love The Wine You're With was released on June 13, 2017. To promote the book, Gruenenfelder embarked on a wine-paired book tour that took her from Vroman's Bookstore in California to Ohio and Pennsylvania.

Reception 
The novel received generally favorable reviews from critics and audiences. The book critic for the Pittsburgh Post-Gazette noted that he rarely reads chick lit, but praised Gruenenfelder for writing "a refreshing summer cocktail of a book." The Public Library Podcast described the book as "extremely relatable for women," and praised Gruenenfelder for accurately capturing midlife crises and connecting to her fans.

References 

2017 American novels
St. Martin's Press books
Chick lit novels